The Municipal Handicap was an American Thoroughbred horse race for horses of either sex age three and older. It was held at Morris Park Racecourse in The Bronx, New York from inception in 1895 through 1904 when the racetrack closed. It was then run at the newly built Belmont Park from 1905 to 1909 then revived in 1914 and run until 1918 when the race was discontinued.

Historical race notes

Ben Holladay's greatness
Eastin & Larabie won this race three straight years from 1897 through 1899 with their outstanding distance runner Ben Holladay who won his first Municipal Handicap under jockey Alonzo Clayton in which he set a new world record time of 2:59 ¼ for a mile and three-quarters. Ben Holladay's owner was a racing and breeding partnership created in 1886 between Montana banker and financier Samuel E. Larabie and Augustus Eastin, a wealthy Kentucky businessman. Following his 1899 season, the Wellington New Zealand Mail newspaper, reporting on racing in the United States, wrote that "Ben Holladay has proved himself this year to be by far the best long-distance horse in America" and quoting a front-page story in New York City's Spirit of the Times said that he is described as "the greatest Cup horse of the decade."

Henry of Navarre, Fair Play and Roamer were winners of the Municipal Handicap who would have careers that resulted in their induction into the U.S. Racing Hall of Fame.

The Hart–Agnew Law: a disaster for racing
On June 11, 1908, the Republican-controlled New York Legislature under Governor Charles Evans Hughes passed the Hart–Agnew anti-betting legislation with penalties allowing for fines and up to a year in prison.

In spite of strong opposition by prominent owners such as August Belmont, Jr. and Harry Payne Whitney, reform legislators were not happy when they learned that betting was still going on at racetracks between individuals and they had further restrictive legislation passed by the New York Legislature in 1910  that made it possible for racetrack owners and members of its board of directors to be fined and imprisoned if anyone was found betting, even privately, anywhere on their premises. After a 1911 amendment to the law to limit the liability of owners and directors was defeated, every racetrack in New York State shut down. The consequences of this law meant the Municipal Handicap was not run from 1910 through 1913.

Records
Speed record:
 2:57 0/0 @ 1¾ miles, Major Daingerfield (1903)
 2:33 2/5 @ 1½ miles, Sunny Slope (1918)
 2:04 0/0 @ 1¼ miles, Roamer (1914)

Most wins:
 3 – Ben Holladay (1897, 1898, 1899)

Most wins by a jockey:
 3 – George M. Odom (1900, 1902, 1903)
 3 – Willie Knapp (1905, 1906, 1907)

Most wins by a trainer:
 3 – Peter Wimmer (1897, 1898, 1899)

Most wins by an owner:
 3 – Augustus Eastin & Samuel E. Larabie (1897, 1898, 1899)

Winners

References

Discontinued horse races in New York City
Morris Park Racecourse
Belmont Park
Open middle distance horse races
Open long distance horse races
Recurring sporting events established in 1895
Recurring sporting events disestablished in 1918
1895 establishments in New York City
1918 disestablishments in New York (state)
Sports in the Bronx